The Architects Collaborative (TAC) was an American architectural firm formed by eight architects that operated between 1945 to 1995 in Cambridge, Massachusetts. The founding members were Norman C. Fletcher (1917–2007), Jean B. Fletcher (1915–1965), John C. Harkness (1916–2016), Sarah P. Harkness (1914–2013), Robert S. McMillan (1916–2001), Louis A. McMillen (1916–1998), Benjamin C. Thompson (1918–2002), and Walter Gropius (1883–1969). TAC created many successful projects, and was well respected for its broad range of designs, being considered one of the most notable firms in post-war modernism.

History
Norman Fletcher, Louis McMillen, Robert McMillan, and Ben Thompson first laid the conceptual foundation for what became the Architects Collaborative while they were classmates at Yale University, where they discussed forming "the World Collaborative," which would be an ideal office combining painting, sculpture, and architecture.

Upon graduation, Norman Fletcher worked with John Harkness during the war at Skidmore, Owings & Merrill in New York, and later, John Harkness worked with Jean Fletcher for Saarinen and Swanson in Bloomfield Hills, Michigan the firm started by Eliel Saarinen. Jean Fletcher and Sarah Harkness had both studied at the Cambridge School of Architecture and Landscape Architecture.

This group of friends were committed to forming a collaborative practice. To help them navigate the professional world and lend notability to the firm, they sought to add a senior practitioner. John Harkness pitched the idea of joining the Architects' Collaborative to Walter Gropius, who had asked Harkness to teach a master's class at Harvard. Walter Gropius agreed and became the eighth member of the group. Other principals came to include Richard Brooker, Alex Cvijanović, Herbert Gallagher, William Geddis, Roland Kluver, Peter Morton and H. Morse Payne, Jr.

Design philosophy and organization

The idea of "collaboration" was the basis of TAC. As described by McMillen, conforming to the ideal of anonymity helped bind the office together. It was carried out in that an entire group of architects have their input on a project, rather than putting an emphasis on individualism. There would be a "partner-in-charge", who would meet with clients and have the final decision of what goes into the design. Originally, each of the eight partners would hold weekly meetings on a Thursday to discuss their projects and be open to design input and ideas. However, as the firm grew larger there were many more people on a team and it was more difficult to consolidate into one group. Therefore, many other "groups" of architects within the firm were formed and carried out the same original objective. The position of the firm's president would be rotated amongst the senior partners.

Work
TAC's initial work consisted of residential projects, mainly single-family houses. The most notable design was Six Moon Hill in Lexington, Massachusetts, a community dwelling in which several of the houses were the residences of the founding partners, excluding Gropius.  Another one of TAC's specialties in this period was school buildings, which included many elementary and secondary public schools throughout Massachusetts and New England. TAC also designed many buildings for universities, among which was the Harvard Graduate Center, a small campus of dormitories and a building devoted to student activities.

King Faisal II had a bidding process for the redesign of the city of Bagdad in order to turn into a busting urban center, the process included many popular postwar architects including Frank Lloyd Wright, Walter Gropius, Le Corbusier, Josep Lluís Sert, and Alvar Aalto. Gropius, alongside The Architects Collaborative designed and planned the entire campus for the University of Baghdad, from 1958 to 1963. Only a few of Gropius' designs survived into the campus' final iteration, the faculty tower, a few classroom buildings, and the Open Mind monument. The project was met with both financial and political difficulties over several years which hampered a timely completion.

TAC's other work included many corporate, government, and recreational buildings in both the United States and internationally.

In its initial decades, TAC's architecture was mainly in the International Style, early examples of which had been created by Gropius and his colleagues at the Bauhaus and elsewhere. Starting in the 1970s, TAC's style largely shifted from modernism to postmodernism, which was generally coming into favor in the architectural field.

Later years and demise
As the firm's staff increased and the scope of the projects became more complex, and an office in Rome was opened in the 1960s, which oversaw projects primarily in Europe and the Middle East. This was followed by the opening of an office in San Francisco in 1985.

Gropius was a part of TAC until his death in 1969 at age 86. The group continued on, but the firm fell into financial problems in the 1980s. This was largely due to TAC being unable to pay expenses which they owed to various financial institutions and other corporations. Among other things, the firm had been losing money in unbuilt designs, especially in the Middle East. TAC was bankrupt and closed in April 1995. In response, many archives and architectural libraries worked fast to retrieve TAC's drawings and records. The majority of these are now stored in the Rotch Library at the Massachusetts Institute of Technology. While the innovative process the TAC architects believed so deeply was carried out successfully, it did not become the norm for architectural firms.

Legacy
For the most part TAC functioned as a team rather than on an individual basis, which was considered a unique method of architectural practice, which reflected Gropius' philosophy of working collaboratively with others when he was a Bauhaus instructor in Germany prior to TAC.

Notable works

See also
The Architects Collaborative, 1945-1965

References

Further reading
"TAC: Principles Process & Product", Currie, Leonard J. and Currie, Virginia M., Process: Architecture,  V 19 pp 40–45, October, 1980 
"The Architects Collaborative 1945-1965" 
"The Architects Collaborative Suspends Operations", Progressive Architecture, v76, June 1995.
"Thirty-five Years of TAC", Harkness, John C., Process: Architecture, v19, pp 11–15, October, 1980

External links
 Great Buildings Online: The Architects' Collaborative

Architects' Collaborative, The
Organizations based in Cambridge, Massachusetts
Walter Gropius